Love and Some Swear Words (Ljubav i poneka psovka) is a Croatian film directed by Antun Vrdoljak and starring Boris Dvornik, Ružica Sokić and Boris Buzančić. It was released in 1969.  It was shown at the 17th Pula Film Festival in the Summer of 1970.

References

External links
 

1969 films
Croatian comedy-drama films
1960s Croatian-language films
Yugoslav comedy-drama films
Films directed by Antun Vrdoljak